Gasulliella is a monotypic genus of gastropods belonging to the family Trissexodontidae. The only species is  Gasulliella simplicula.

The species is found in Iberian Peninsula.

References

Trissexodontidae